SM U-161 was one of the 329 submarines serving in the Imperial German Navy in World War I. 
U-161 was engaged in naval warfare and took part in the First Battle of the Atlantic.

U-161 was surrendered to the Allies at Harwich on 20 November 1918 in accordance with the requirements of the Armistice with Germany. Having been exhibited at Devonport in December 1918, she was then laid up there until sunk as in the English Channel by gunfire from the submarines L21 and L52 on 30 June 1921 in company with U-135.

Design
German Type U 93 submarines were preceded by the shorter Type U 87 submarines. U-161 had a displacement of  when at the surface and  while submerged. The submarine was powered by two  engines for use while surfaced, and two  engines for use while submerged. She had two propeller shafts and two  propellers.

U-161 was fitted with six  torpedo tubes (four at the bow and two at the stern), twelve to sixteen torpedoes, and one  SK L/45 deck gun. She had a complement of thirty-six (thirty-two crew members and four officers).

References

Notes

Citations

Bibliography

World War I submarines of Germany
German Type U 93 submarines
Ships built in Bremen (state)
1918 ships
U-boats commissioned in 1918
Maritime incidents in 1921